Michael "Tanker" Malley (born July 8, 1962) is a Canadian former politician in New Brunswick, Canada. He represented the riding of Miramichi-Bay du Vin in the Legislative Assembly of New Brunswick from 1999 to 2006 and served as Speaker of the Assembly for part of 2006.

Political career
Malley, a former Miramichi city councillor and bus driver, was first elected to the legislature in the 1999 election and was re-elected in 2003.

The 2003 election returned his Progressive Conservatives to a majority government of just a one-seat margin.  Malley was named whip, a position of expanded importance in a legislature with such close numbers.  He was widely called upon by leaders in his community to leave the government in 2004 if the Lord government did not back away from rumoured health care cuts in the region.  In the end the cuts were not as severe as had been rumoured and Malley remained in caucus.

On February 17, 2006, shortly after a cabinet shuffle, Malley announced he would leave the Conservative caucus to sit as an independent.  He expressed disappointment in the government's overall direction and in his not being included in cabinet despite being the only representative of Miramichi in the Conservative caucus   He argued that whereas Miramichi is the province's fourth largest city and where the three larger cities have significant representation (Moncton with 4, Saint John with 3 and Fredericton with 3), Miramichi ought to have had a member in the cabinet.  His argument here was somewhat flawed, in that the cities proper have 2, 1 and 1 respectively, the numbers above include surrounding areas; the Miramichi area, if viewed through the same lens, has one cabinet member in Rogersville-Kouchibouguac MLA Rose-May Poirier.

Premier Bernard Lord has alleged Malley had less savory motives for leaving Lord's governing Conservative party.  Lord alleged at a news conference that Malley made five specific demands in exchange for staying with the Conservatives, including: more money for his constituency office, more help for the Miramichi's troubled paper mill and the appointment of a female friend as his special assistant
. Lord further alleged that Malley demanded he immediately appoint Fredericton lawyer Cleveland Allaby, who Lord called a "good friend" of Mr. Malley's, as provincial court judge in the Miramichi. Allaby, however, denied this allegation and Lord admitted that he had no proof of any of the alleged demands. Malley has also denied these allegations.

Malley's floor crossing was especially significant because it changed Lord's Progressive Conservative government from a majority to a minority with the standings becoming: Progressive Conservatives 27, opposition Liberal Party 26 and two independents including Malley and former Liberal Frank Branch.  When Malley announced he was leaving the Conservatives, he stated that he would use his new position of influence to support legislation that helps the poor people of New Brunswick and residents of the Miramichi region.

Speaker of the Legislative Assembly of New Brunswick
On March 28, 2006, Malley was acclaimed as Speaker of the Legislature after Tony Huntjens, the nominee of Bernard Lord, withdrew his name.  Electing Malley as speaker, a position in which one only votes in the case of a tie, instead of a member of the government caucus, provides the government considerable more flexibility.  Though still technically a minority government, by tradition, should there be a tie on a vote of confidence, the Speaker would vote in favour of the government.

On April 13, 2006, Malley announced he was rejoining the Progressive Conservative caucus, though as Speaker he would not attend caucus meetings and he would remain impartial.  Liberal leader Shawn Graham and New Democratic Party leader Allison Brewer (whose party is not currently represented in the legislature, but was from 1991 to 2005) criticized the decision.  Graham said Malley was making the legislature the "laughing stock" of the Commonwealth because of the unusual and unprecedented move of a, by definition, non-partisan Speaker announcing from his chair his change in partisan affiliation.  Brewer said a mockery was being made of office of speaker.  As Malley remains only able to vote in the case of a tie, the actual status of the legislature is unchanged with 27 ordinally voting members of the government, 27 members of the opposition and an impartial Speaker.  The significance of this move, however, is a motion passed by the legislature in 2003 which requires the opposition withhold a vote on committees on which the government does not have a majority in order to "preserve the government majority".  Premier Benard Lord argues he now has a majority again and the opposition should honour the terms of that motion while the Opposition has said that they do not recognize a change of affiliation from a speaker in the chair and will still operate as if the government were in a minority situation until such time as the Speaker resigns, sits among the Conservative caucus and re-offers for his office as a Conservative. 

Through much of May, the Government and Opposition began to negotiate to bring some order back to the legislature.  With only two parties represented, the tight numbers make it difficult for the Government to pass some of its agenda through the House and they had proposed radical rule changes to increase their majority inside of legislative committees.  The Liberals opposed this saying it would turn the legislature into little more than a rubber stamp.  A counter proposal offered by the Liberals was to see Malley resign as speaker and, in exchange, the Liberals would allow one of their members to stand for the post therefore increasing the working majority of the government by 2 votes.  In exchange for this, the Liberals wanted an early election in the fall of 2006.  Though the Conservative Government rejected this offer, the Liberals and Conservatives began negotiations which included the possibility of removing Malley from office.  On May 24, 2006, Government House Leader Bev Harrison, Malley's predecessor as Speaker, said the government would not force Malley from office but, were he still Speaker, he would resign to resolve the deadlock.  Malley has refused to comment to the media on this situation. 

A vote on May 30, 2006 to remove Malley from office was defeated 27 to 25.  Later however fellow Progressive Conservative Peter Mesheau announced his plans to resign from the legislature and rather than face another minority, Bernard Lord called an election.  Malley sought re-election against Bill Fraser, the man who led the protests against hospital cuts in Malley's region.

In the general provincial election of September 18, 2006, Malley lost his seat to Liberal challenger Bill Fraser. Malley was soundly defeated, trailing his opponent by better than 20 percent in the popular vote.

Following his defeat, Malley was expected to continue to receive a salary as Speaker, though not as MLA, until a new Speaker is elected on February 6, 2007.  This attracted some controversy.

References

 Moncton Times & Transcript, "Tanker Jumps Back to Tories", Page A1/A5, April 14, 2006.
 New Brunswick Telegraph-Journal, "Former Speaker says he would step aside to help end gridlock", Page A1/A8, May 25, 2006.
 Moncton Times & Transcript, "Tanker loses job, keeps salary", Page A1, October 6, 2006.

External links
Canadian Press: Tory N.B. member of legislature to sit as independent, legislature even

1962 births
Living people
Progressive Conservative Party of New Brunswick MLAs
Speakers of the Legislative Assembly of New Brunswick
People from Northumberland County, New Brunswick
New Brunswick municipal councillors
21st-century Canadian politicians